The spotted emo skink or spotted blue-tailed skink (Emoia maculata) is a species of lizard in the family Scincidae. It is found in the Solomon Islands.

References

Emoia
Reptiles described in 1954
Taxa named by Walter Creighton Brown